The Way of the West is a 1934 American Western film directed by Robert Emmett Tansey.

Cast 
Hal Taliaferro as Wally Gordon
Bobby Nelson as Bobby Parker
Myrla Bratton as "Fiery" Parker
Fred Parker as Dad Parker
William Desmond as 'Cash' Horton
Art Mix as Henchman Tim
James Sheridan as Henchman Skippy
Bill Patton as Buck
Jack Jones as Sheriff #2 - Jed Hampton
Harry Beery as Older Cowhand
Helen Gibson as Townswoman
Tiny Skelton as Tiny (ranch hand)
Gene Layman as Jeff Thompson
Jimmy Aubrey as Sheriff #1 / Bartender Jim

External links 

1934 films
1930s English-language films
American black-and-white films
1934 Western (genre) films
American Western (genre) films
Films directed by Robert Emmett Tansey
1930s American films